National Olympic Committee of Ivory Coast (IOC code: CIV) is the National Olympic Committee representing Ivory Coast.

See also
 Ivory Coast at the Olympics

References

Ivory Coast
Ivory Coast at the Olympics